Maurice De Muer (4 October 1921 – 4 March 2012) was a French cyclist who rode as a professional between 1943 and 1951 and later became a cycling team manager.

He won Paris–Camembert in 1944 and finished second in the 1946 edition of Paris–Nice. He also rode in the 1947 and 1948 Tour de France.

De Muer is mostly remembered as a cycling team manager.  He started by supporting a small team, Pelforth-Wild-Lejeune, recruiting aggressive riders. This team was allowed to participate in the Tour de France in 1963.   He became noticed as a sports director when in 1964 one of his cyclists Georges Groussard wore the yellow jersey for 10 days. He then led the team Bic (1969-1974) with which he led the fiery Luis Ocaña to victory in the Tour de France in 1973.  He managed the Peugeot cycling team from 1975 to 1982.

Major results
 1941
 Grand Prix de Fourmies
 1943
 2e Wanferçée-Baulet (BEL)
 1944
 Paris–Camembert (Trophée Lepetit)
 1945
 8e Paris–Roubaix
 1946
 3e Paris–Tours
 2e Paris–Nice
 1947
 Grand Prix de l'Écho d'Alger
 8e Paris–Roubaix
 1950
 Tour de la Manche

References

1921 births
2012 deaths
Sportspeople from Calvados (department)
French male cyclists
Cyclists from Normandy